Monneellus rhodopus is a species of beetle in the family Cerambycidae, the only species in the genus Monneellus.

References

Trachyderini
Monotypic beetle genera